Belfort – Montbéliard TGV is a high speed railway station located in Meroux, Territoire de Belfort, eastern France. The station was opened in 2011 and is located on the LGV Rhin-Rhône connecting railway. The train services are operated by SNCF. It serves the cities of Belfort and Montbéliard and surrounding areas. The station lies 9 km south of Belfort and 18 km northeast of Montbéliard.

At the station, the railway line from Belfort to Delle crosses the high speed line with an overpass. There is a stop on this line, Meroux, at a short walking distance of the TGV station, which offers access to TER Bourgogne-Franche-Comté services to Belfort and Delle, and RegioExpress services to Delle and Delémont (Switzerland).

Train services
From Belfort - Montbéliard TGV train services depart to major French cities such as: Paris, Dijon, Besançon, Mulhouse, Strasbourg, Lyon, Marseille, Montpellier and Lille.

International services operate to Switzerland: Basel and Zurich.

High speed services (TGV) Paris - Dijon - Belfort - Mulhouse - Basel - Zurich
High speed services (TGV) Paris - Dijon - Belfort - Mulhouse
High speed services (TGV) (Nice -) Marseille - Lyon - Dijon - Strasbourg (- Nancy )
High speed services (TGV) Marseille / Montpellier - Lyon - Belfort - Mulhouse - Strasbourg / Metz / Luxembourg
High speed services (ICE) Marseille - Avignon - Lyon - Belfort - Mulhouse - Strasbourg - Frankfurt
High speed services (TGV) Lille - Paris-Charles de Gaulle Airport - Dijon - Belfort - Mulhouse

References

Railway stations in France opened in 2011
Railway stations in Territoire de Belfort